The Torqueflite 8 (also known as the 850RE Torqueflite) is an 8-speed automatic transmission built by Chrysler Group LLC at the Kokomo Transmission Plant and the Kokomo Casting plant, in Kokomo, Indiana. Production began in 2013.
Although the 850RE Torqueflite is built-and-designed in the United States, the design is licensed from the German built-and-designed ZF 8HP transmission, made by ZF Friedrichshafen AG, in Saarbrücken, Germany.

References

Automatic transmission tradenames
Chrysler transmissions
Chrysler
Auto parts